Vrba, which means 'willow' in several Slavic languages, may refer to:

People with the surname 
 Cenek J. Vrba (born 1947), Czechoslovak violinist and concertmaster
 Elisabeth Vrba (born 1942), American paleontologist at Yale University
 Ivan Vrba (born 1977), Czech track cyclist
 Jan Vrba (born 1982), Czech bobsledder
 Pavel Vrba (born 1963), Czech football manager
 Rudolf Vrba (1924–2006), co-author of the Vrba-Wetzler report about the Auschwitz concentration camp

Places

Austria 
 Velden am Wörther See

Bosnia and Herzegovina 
 Vrba (Glamoč), Bosnia and Herzegovina
 Vrba (Gacko), Bosnia and Herzegovina

Montenegro 
 Vrba, Pljevlja

Serbia 
 Vrba (Kraljevo)
 Vrba (Jagodina)
 Vrba (Tutin)

Slovenia 
 Vrba, Dobrna
 Vrba, Lukovica
 Vrba, Žirovnica

Other uses 
 Vrba (leafhopper), a leafhopper genus in the tribe Erythroneurini
 "Vrba" (poem), in Kytice, anthology by Karel Jaromír Erben

See also
 Vrbas (disambiguation)